Cyrtodactylus mamanwa  is a species of gecko endemic to the Philippines. It was identified in 2010 from a sample collected in 2007 on the Dinagat Island and named after the Mamanwa indigenous group. It is also found on Siargao and nearby islands. Adults reach a total body length of ca. 19 cm. This gecko feeds mostly on insects 
and spends most of its life on trees. Females lay two brittle eggs under barks of trees or inside tree cavities.

References

Cyrtodactylus
Reptiles of the Philippines
Reptiles described in 2010